This article contains the list of past and present Qawwali singers that are based in Pakistan & India.
Following are the most popular Pakistani Qawwali singers of all times.

A
 Aziz Mian
 Abida Parveen
 Amjad Sabri

B    
 Badar Ali Khan also known as  Badar Miandad Qawwal

F
 Farrukh Fateh Ali Khan
 Fateh Ali Khan
 Fareed Ayaz

J 
 Javed Bashir

M
 Munshi Raziuddin
 Manzoor Ahmed Khan

N
 Nusrat Fateh Ali Khan

Q                                                                                                                     
 Qawwal Bahauddin Khan

R
 Rahat Fateh Ali Khan
 Rizwan-Muazzam Qawwali Group

S
 Sabri Brothers
 Sher Miandad

See also

 Music of Pakistan  
 List of Pakistanis
 Music of South Asia
 Culture of Pakistan

Qawwali Singers
Singers